

Historical or architectural interest bridges

Major bridges

Notes and References 
 Notes

 Nicolas Janberg, Structurae.com, International Database for Civil and Structural Engineering

 Others references

See also 

 Transport in Tunisia
 List of Roman bridges
 List of aqueducts in the Roman Empire

Further reading 
 

Tunisia

b
Bridges